The 1968 Richmond Spiders football team was an American football team that represented the University of Richmond as a member of the Southern Conference (SoCon) during the 1968 NCAA University Division football season. In their third season under head coach Frank Jones, Richmond compiled an 8–3 record, with a mark of 6–0 in conference play, finishing as SoCon champion. In the postseason, the Spiders defeated Ohio in the Tangerine Bowl.

Schedule

References

Richmond
Richmond Spiders football seasons
Southern Conference football champion seasons
Citrus Bowl champion seasons
Richmond Spiders football